Belgrandiella bachkovoensis is a species of minute freshwater snail with a gill and an operculum, an aquatic gastropod mollusk in the family Hydrobiidae.

Distribution
The species is endemic to Bulgaria. It has a very restricted distribution in a small stream (approx. 200m in length) in the Western Rhodopes, near the Bedechka River.

References

External links

Gastropods described in 2009
Hydrobiidae
Belgrandiella
Endemic fauna of Bulgaria